In the United States, there is a widespread practice of employee stock ownership. It began with industrial companies and today is particularly common in the technology sector but also companies in other industries, such as Whole Foods and Starbucks.

Types 
Employee Stock Ownership Plans (ESOPs) were developed as a way to encourage capital expansion and economic equality. Many of the early proponents of ESOPs believed that capitalism's viability depended upon continued growth and that there was no better way for economies to grow than by distributing the benefits of that growth to the workforce. 

Employee stock purchase plans (ESPPs) are a program run by companies for their employees, enabling them to purchase company shares at a discounted price. These schemes may or may not qualify as tax efficient. 

In the U.S., stock options granted to employees are of two forms, that differ primarily in their tax treatment.  They may be either: 

 Incentive stock options (ISOs)
 Non-qualified stock options (NQSOs or NSOs)

History
In the mid-19th century, as the United States transitioned to an industrial economy, national corporations like Procter & Gamble, Railway Express Agency, Sears & Roebuck, and others recognized that someone could work for the companies for 20 plus years, reach an old age and then have no income after they could no longer work. 

The leaders of those 19th century companies decided to set aside stock in the company that would be given to employees when they retired.

In the early 20th century, when the United States sanctioned an income tax on all citizens, one of the biggest debates was about how to treat stock set aside for an employee by his employer under the new US income tax laws.

In 1956, Louis Kelso invented the first ESOP, which allowed the employees of Peninsula Newspapers to buy out the company founders. Chairman of the Senate Finance Committee, Senator Russell Long, a Democrat from Louisiana, helped develop tax policy for ESOPs within the Employee Retirement Income Security Act of 1974 (ERISA), calling it one of his most important accomplishments in his career. ESOPs also attracted interest of Republican leaders including Barry Goldwater, Richard Nixon, Gerald Ford, and Ronald Reagan. Through an ESOP, the Engineering and Architectural company Burns & McDonnell is to 100% employee owned since 1985.

In his 2020 Presidential campaign, Bernie Sanders proposed that 20% of stocks in corporations with over $100 million in annual revenue be owned by the corporation's workers.

See also 

Employee stock ownership
Employee stock option

References 

United States